Harry Stanback (born August 17, 1958) is a former American football defensive end. He played for the Baltimore Colts in 1982.

References

1958 births
Living people
American football defensive ends
North Carolina Tar Heels football players
Baltimore Colts players